In Greek mythology, Thestius (Ancient Greek: Θέστιος) was a king of Pleuronians in Aetolia. He is not to be confused with Thespius, who was sometimes referred to as "Thestius". The patronymic "Thestias" may refer to one of his daughters, Leda or Althaea, and "Thestiades" to his son Iphiclus.

Family 
Thestius was the son either of Ares by Demonice or Pisidice, or of Agenor (son of Pleuron) possibly by Epicasta. He was the brother of Evenus, Pylus and Molus or of Demonice and Porthaon instead. Thestius was the father of Iphiclus by Leucippe or Eurythemis, daughter of Cleoboea, who was the mother of his other children, Althaea, Eurypylus, Evippus, Hypermnestra, Leda and Plexippus. In other sources, the mother of Iphiclus, Althaea and Leda was named either Laophonte, daughter of Pleuron or Deidameia, daughter of Perieres. Other sons of Thestius were Cometes and Prothous, Toxeus,  Aphares and Calydon.

Mythology 
Thestius was allied with Tyndareus and Icarius against Hippocoon. According to Strabo, when Tyndareus and his brother Icarius, after being banished by Hippocoön from their homeland, went to Thestius, the king of the Pleuronii. The king helped the two brothers to acquire possession of much of the country on the far side of the Acheloüs on condition that they should receive a share of it. Tyndareus, however, went back home, having married Leda, the daughter of Thestius, whereas Icarius stayed on, keeping a portion of Acarnania, and by Polycaste, the daughter of Lygaeus, begot both Penelope and her brothers.

In a rare variant of the myth by Plutarch, the river Achelous in Aetolia was formerly called after Thestius. This Thestius who upon some domestic discontent traveled as far as Sicyon, where he had resided for some time, returned to his native home. But finding there his son Calydon and his mother [i.e. Pisidice] both upon the bed together, believing him to be an adulterer, slew his own child by a mistake. But when he beheld the unfortunate and unexpected fact he had committed, he threw himself into the river Axenos, which from thence was afterwards called Thestius.

Notes

References 

 Aeschylus, translated in two volumes. 2. Libation Bearers by Herbert Weir Smyth, Ph. D. Cambridge, MA. Harvard University Press. 1926. Online version at the Perseus Digital Library. Greek text available from the same website.
 Apollodorus, The Library with an English Translation by Sir James George Frazer, F.B.A., F.R.S. in 2 Volumes, Cambridge, MA, Harvard University Press; London, William Heinemann Ltd. 1921. . Online version at the Perseus Digital Library. Greek text available from the same website.
Apollonius Rhodius, Argonautica translated by Robert Cooper Seaton (1853-1915), R. C. Loeb Classical Library Volume 001. London, William Heinemann Ltd, 1912. Online version at the Topos Text Project.
 Apollonius Rhodius, Argonautica. George W. Mooney. London. Longmans, Green. 1912. Greek text available at the Perseus Digital Library.
 Bacchylides, Odes translated by Diane Arnson Svarlien. 1991. Online version at the Perseus Digital Library.
 Bacchylides, The Poems and Fragments. Cambridge University Press. 1905. Greek text available at the Perseus Digital Library.
 Euripides, The Plays of Euripides, translated by E. P. Coleridge. Volume II. London. George Bell and Sons. 1891. Online version at the Perseus Digital Library.
 Euripides, Euripidis Fabulae. vol. 3. Gilbert Murray. Oxford. Clarendon Press, Oxford. 1913. Greek text available at the Perseus Digital Library.
 Gaius Julius Hyginus, Fabulae from The Myths of Hyginus translated and edited by Mary Grant. University of Kansas Publications in Humanistic Studies. Online version at the Topos Text Project.
 Lucius Mestrius Plutarchus, Morals translated from the Greek by several hands. Corrected and revised by. William W. Goodwin, PH. D. Boston. Little, Brown, and Company. Cambridge. Press Of John Wilson and son. 1874. 5. Online version at the Perseus Digital Library.
 Pausanias, Description of Greece with an English Translation by W.H.S. Jones, Litt.D., and H.A. Ormerod, M.A., in 4 Volumes. Cambridge, MA, Harvard University Press; London, William Heinemann Ltd. 1918. . Online version at the Perseus Digital Library
 Pausanias, Graeciae Descriptio. 3 vols. Leipzig, Teubner. 1903.  Greek text available at the Perseus Digital Library.
 Strabo, The Geography of Strabo. Edition by H.L. Jones. Cambridge, Mass.: Harvard University Press; London: William Heinemann, Ltd. 1924. Online version at the Perseus Digital Library.
 Strabo, Geographica edited by A. Meineke. Leipzig: Teubner. 1877. Greek text available at the Perseus Digital Library.

Kings in Greek mythology
Children of Ares
Demigods in classical mythology
Family of Calyce
Aetolian characters in Greek mythology
Laconian mythology